The Sucre antpitta (Grallaricula cumanensis) is a species of bird placed in the family Grallariidae.

It is found in the Venezuelan Coastal Range. Its natural habitat is subtropical or tropical moist montane forests.

References

Clements, J. F., T. S. Schulenberg, M. J. Iliff, B.L. Sullivan, C. L. Wood, and D. Roberson. 2011. The Clements checklist of birds of the world: Version 6.6. Downloaded from http://www.birds.cornell.edu/clementschecklist/downloadable-clements-checklist 2011

Sucre antpitta
Birds of the Venezuelan Coastal Range
Sucre antpitta